Make a Woman Cry is a 2015 South Korean television series starring Kim Jung-eun and Song Chang-eui. It aired on MBC on Saturdays and Sundays at 20:45 for 40 episodes beginning April 18, 2015.

Plot
Jung Deok-in was once a homicide detective, but she quit her job after the death of her only son. To preserve his memory, she now runs a food stall in front of her son's school, where she also tries to protect the neighborhood children and her student customers from bullying and other dangers. As Deok-in goes on a journey to discover the truth behind her son's death, she must go through a staggering process of healing and forgiveness.

Cast
Kim Jung-eun as Jung Deok-in
Song Chang-eui as Kang Jin-woo
Ha Hee-ra as Na Eun-soo
Oh Dae-gyu as Kang Jin-myung
Lee Tae-ran as Choi Hong-ran
In Gyo-jin as Hwang Kyung-chul
Lee Soon-jae as Kang Tae-hwan
Han Do-woo as Kang Yoon-seo
Shin Ji-woon as Kang Min-seo
Park Sang-hyun as Kang Hyun-seo
Han Yi-seo as Kang Jin-hee
Seo Woo-rim as Min Jung-sook
Han Bo-bae as Hwang Kyung-ah
Ji Il-joo as Hwang Kyung-tae
Jin Seon-kyu as Hwang Kyung-soo
Kim Ji-young as Bok-rye
Lee Da-in as Park Hyo-jung
Park Cheon-guk as Park Ho Shik
Kim Hae-sook as Park Hwa-soon (cameo)
Kim Jin-seong

Ratings 
In this table,  represent the lowest ratings and  represent the highest ratings.

Awards and nominations

International broadcast
 It aired in Vietnam from October 14, 2016, on TV Star - SCTV11, under the name Đừng làm em khóc.

References

External links
Make a Woman Cry official MBC website 
Don't Make Her Cry at MBC Global Media

MBC TV television dramas
2015 South Korean television series debuts
Korean-language television shows
2015 South Korean television series endings
South Korean romance television series